Assam State Premier League (ASPL) is the state-level top division football league in the Indian state of Assam, organised by Assam Football Association and Guwahati Sports Association. The inaugural edition of the league started in 2008 with Assam Rifles SC winning its first title. However, Bodoland Martyrs Gold Cup winners United Chirang Duar FC got latest regional I-League 2 qualifier spot.

Competition structure

The winner of Assam State Premier League gets promoted to I-League 2, and the last position team gets relegated to the Assam Club Championship. GSA Super Division Football League. From 2015 season the league has been revamped with the new format. The teams have been divided into two zones - Upper Assam and Lower Assam. The league began with the group stage. The top four teams from each zone qualified for the quarterfinals. The group matches were played on home and away basis.

Most recent teams
The 12 clubs of ASPL are divided into two zones.

Champions

See also
Nehru Maidan
Indira Gandhi Athletic Stadium
Nehru Stadium, Guwahati
Assam Football Association
Bordoloi Trophy
ATPA Shield
Bodousa Cup
Independence Day Cup

References

External links

 
4
2008 establishments in Assam
Sports leagues established in 2008
Football in Assam